Northern Township may refer to the following townships in the United States:

 Northern Township, Beltrami County, Minnesota
 Northern Township, Franklin County, Illinois

See also 
 Northern Liberties Township, Pennsylvania